Farzad Hatami (born 3 January 1986) is an Iranian professional footballer who plays for Paykan in the Persian Gulf Pro League.

Hatami has played for clubs including Esteghlal and Persepolis. He joined Oxin Alborz in August 2018. He joined Pars Jonoubi in January 2019, signing a contract until the end of the 2018–19 season.

Club career

Club career statistics

 Assist Goals

International career
He made his debut against Korea Republic on 18 June 2013 as a substitute where Iran qualified for the 2014 World Cup.

Honours

Club
Sepahan
Iran Pro League (1): 2009–10

Tractor
Iran Pro League:
Runner-up (1): 2011–12

Esteghlal
Iran Pro League (1): 2012–13

Persepolis
Iran Pro League:
Runner-up (1): 2013–14

References

External links

1986 births
Living people
Sportspeople from Tehran
Iranian footballers
Iran international footballers
Association football forwards
Fajr Sepasi players
Rah Ahan players
Gabala FC players
Sepahan S.C. footballers
Saba players
Tractor S.C. players
Esteghlal F.C. players
Foolad FC players
Persepolis F.C. players
Sanat Mes Kerman F.C. players
Malavan players
Pars Jonoubi Jam players
Iranian expatriate footballers
Iranian expatriate sportspeople in Azerbaijan
Expatriate footballers in Azerbaijan
Azerbaijan Premier League players
Persian Gulf Pro League players
Azadegan League players
Naft Masjed Soleyman F.C. players